Loni Rose (born 1971) is a U.S. singer-songwriter from Seattle, Washington.  Outside of the Pacific Northwest she is perhaps best known for her appearances on the soundtracks of over twenty films and television shows, including American Pie, Providence, Roswell, Jack & Jill, MTV's Road Rules, and Life Without Dick starring Sarah Jessica Parker and Harry Connick, Jr.. She has compiled an arsenal of over 100 songs and 4 independent releases.

Her earliest commercial success was in 1993, when her track "Evergreen Christmas" landed on the annual Northwest Favorite Christmas in the Northwest CD. Evergreen Christmas has held one of the top 10 slots on Seattle's Warm 106.9 FM's Top 200 Christmas Songs Countdown. In 1999, she won the Lilith Fair contest in Seattle, appearing on that concert's village stage, where she performed alongside Sarah McLachlan and Sheryl Crow. Her popularity further increased when she won Seattle's Battle of the Girlbands in 2003, which was a contest put on by a local mainstream FM radio station, 106.1 KISS FM. Loni ended up opening up for the radio station's Summer Music Festival with artists including Nelly Furtado, Vertical Horizon, and Smash Mouth. It's this kind of instant appeal that has earned Loni Rose a place onstage with artists like Chris Isaak, Shawn Colvin, Five for Fighting, Jewel and Kenny Loggins.

Independently released albums 
 Radio Flyer – EP (1995)
 Naked Soul (1997)
 Starlight – EP (1999, 2001, 2005)
 Shine – EP (2007)
 The Shine Sessions (2008)

References

External links
Official website

1970s births
Musicians from Seattle
Living people
Place of birth missing (living people)
Year of birth uncertain
Singer-songwriters from Washington (state)
21st-century American singers